António Leite (21 August 1899 – 26 April 1958) was a Portuguese fencer. He competed in the team Épée event at the 1924 Summer Olympics.

References

External links
 

1899 births
1958 deaths
Portuguese male épée fencers
Olympic fencers of Portugal
Fencers at the 1924 Summer Olympics
Sportspeople from Twickenham